Folgefonna National Park is a  national park in Vestland county, Norway.  The park is located on the Folgefonna peninsula and it spans the municipalities of Kvinnherad, Etne, and Ullensvang. The national park was opened by Queen Sonja on 14 May 2005.

Folgefonna is a collective term for three glaciers in the park (Nordre Folgefonna, Midtre Folgefonna, and Søndre Folgefonna).  At , Folgefonna is the third largest ice cap in Norway. It probably reaches a maximum

Etymology
The first element is folge means 'thin layer of snow' and the last element is the finite form of fonn which means 'mass of snow' or 'glacier made of snow'.

Flora and fauna
The high mountains of the park are too barren for many creatures to thrive, but there the ptarmigans thrive. Golden eagles nest in several valleys that reach up towards the glacier and they feed on the ptarmigans in the glacial areas. Meadow pipits are the most abundant species above the tree line.  In the wooded areas below the tree line, red deer are abundant, in fact more red deer are shot in Kvinnherad municipality than anywhere else in the country. Black grouse and capercaillie can also be found in the pine forests. This is also one of the last places to find the white-backed woodpecker in all of Western Europe.  Avalanches in this area leave many dead trees in their paths and this is exactly the habitat favoured by these woodpeckers.

Hardy species like three-leaved rush, dwarf willow, and stiff sedge thrive despite the poor soils. Mossy mountain heather, rufine sedge, and arctic cottongrass can all grow right up to the edge of the glaciers.  Purple gentian and mountain queen are notable flowering plants that thrive in the park.

References

External links

National parks of Norway
Kvinnherad
Etne
Ullensvang
Protected areas established in 2005
Protected areas of Vestland
Tourist attractions in Vestland
2005 establishments in Norway